Sir Francis Hamilton, 1st Baronet, of Killock (1606–1673), also called of Castle Hamilton and of Killeshandra, was an Irish landowner and Member of the Irish Parliaments of 1640–1649 and 1661–1666.

Birth and origins 
Francis was born in 1606, the eldest son of Claud Hamilton of Clonyn and his wife Jane Lauder. His father was the second son of Alexander Hamilton of Innerwick in Scotland. Francis was called "of Creichness" in Scotland and "of Clonyn" (County Cavan) in Ireland. Francis's mother was a daughter of Robert Lauder of the Bass in Scotland.

Ulster Plantation 
On 23 June 1610 Francis's grandfather Alexander was granted the great (2000 acres) proportion of Clonyn, also known as Tagleagh, in the Tullaghchinko (also called Tollochonee) precinct, County Cavan. This plantation precinct corresponds to the modern barony of Tullyhunco. He never came to see this proportion and his son Claud, Francis's father, took over its possession.

Baronet 
On 29 September 1628 Hamilton was created a Baronet in the Baronetage of Nova Scotia.

First marriage and children 
About 1630 Sir Francis, as he was now, married Laetitia Coote, daughter of Sir Charles Coote, 1st Baronet and his wife Dorothea Cuffe.

Francis and Laetitia had at least one child:
Sir Charles Hamilton, 2nd Baronet, of Castle Hamilton

Manor 
In 1631 the three estates Clonkine, Carrotubber, and Clonyn, were consolidated in a manor that was originally called Castle Killagh, but was later known as Castle Hamilton. The mentioned estates correspond to the modern townlands Clonkeen, Corratober, and Clooneen, which all are in the barony of Tullyhunco of County Cavan. Castle Hamilton stands east of the village of Killeshandra.

Parliament 1640–1649 
He was a member of the Irish Parliaments of 1640–1649 In the Irish general election of 1640 he was returned for one of the two seats of Jamestown Borough in County Leitrim.

Second marriage 
He married Elizabeth Barlow after 1658 as her third husband. She was a daughter of Randolph Barlow, Archbishop of Tuam. She had married first William Hay, who had died in 1635 and then Sir Francis Willoughby, who had died in 1658.

Parliament 1661–1666 
He was a member of the Irish Parliaments of 1661–1666. In the Irish general election of 1661 he was returned for one of the two seats of Cavan County.

Death and succession 
Hamilton died in 1673 and was succeeded by his eldest son Charles as 2nd Baronet.

Notes and references

Notes

Citations

Sources 

  – 1603 to 1624
 
  – 1625 to 1649
  – (for timeline)
 
 
  – Parliaments & Biographies (PDF downloaded from given URL)

1606 births
1673 deaths
17th-century Anglo-Irish people
Baronets in the Baronetage of Nova Scotia
Irish MPs 1639–1649
Irish MPs 1661–1666
Members of the Parliament of Ireland (pre-1801) for County Cavan constituencies
Members of the Parliament of Ireland (pre-1801) for County Leitrim constituencies